is a Japanese mystery drama film directed by Yasuo Furuhata.

Plot

Cast
Junichi Okada as Atsushi Shikata
Shun Oguri as Keita Tadokoro
Tasuku Emoto as Satoru Kawabata
Masami Nagasawa as Minako Shikata
Fumino Kimura as Mari Tadokoro
Kenichi Yajima
Takahiro Miura
Kiyohiko Shibukawa
Lily
Naomi Nishida
Sakura Ando as Ryoko Nishina
Hidetaka Yoshioka as Mitsuo Yamagata

References

External links 
 

2017 films
2010s Japanese-language films
Films directed by Yasuo Furuhata
Toho films
Films set in Ishikawa Prefecture
2010s Japanese films